Saippuaprinsessa (Finnish: The Soap Princess) is a 2004 historical novel by Finnish author Kaari Utrio focusing on the frivolities of the high society in Helsinki, the capital of Grand Duchy of Finland in the 1830s.

Characters
Ulrika Rutenfelt, a rich heiress
Mauritz Ekestolpe, a baron
Detlev Henning, a millionaire from Livonia
Eva Madgalena Ekestolpe, a dowager baroness, Mauritz's mother
Viktoria von Sperling, a beauty, Mauritz's fiancée
Herman von Sperling, Viktoria's brother
Amanda Ekestolpe, Mauritz's sister
Fredrik Ekestolpe, Mauritz's brother
Kristian Bruun, Fredrik's tutor
Axel Rutenfelt, His Excellency
Olivia Rutenfelt, Her Ladyship
Lemarchand, Her Ladyship's ladies' maid
Natalie Fedorovna Bogatyrski-Gee, a Russian princess
Sergei Zagoretski, an officer, Herman's friend
Mr Grubbe, the solicitor of the Rutenfelts
Frans Hukani, a friend of the Ekestolpe family
Rosa Hukani, a divine cook
Oskar Bong, the land agent of Ekestolpe family estate
Katri Bong, a healer
Anders Hipping, a rector
Mr Lindgren, a cantor
Strömmer, the driver of the Ekestolpe family
Dahlgren, the butler of the Ekestolpe family
Mrs Dahlgren, the housekeeper of the Ekestolpe family
Tebell, the butler of the Rutenfelts
Maja, a housemaid in the Rutenfelt Manor
Old Mother Böök, Ulrika's chaperon
Hjelt, the driver of the Rutenfelts
Pelander, the driver of the von Sperlings
General Governor Thesleff, the regent of the Grand Duchy of Finland
Parfeni Maximovits Martynov, a Russian merchant
Mrs Jägerskiöld, a Court Counsellor's wife
Mrs von Löwen, a College Counsellor's wife
Mrs Hampus, a Trade Counsellor's wife
Lady Mellin, a baroness
Mrs Hagemeister, a State Counsellor's wife

References

External links
 

Novels by Kaari Utrio
Novels set in Helsinki
Novels set in the 1830s
2004 novels
Tammi (company) books
21st-century Finnish novels
Finnish historical novels